Howgego is a surname. Notable people with the surname include:

 Ben Howgego (born 1988), an English cricketer
 Christopher Howgego (born 1957), a British numismatist and academic
 James Howgego (born 1948), an English cricketer